Gianello della Torre or to Spaniards Juanelo Turriano or Giovanni Torriani, c. 1500 — 1585) was an Italo-Spanish clockmaker, engineer and mathematician. He was born in Cremona.

Biography
Philip II of Spain named him .
He, however, did not get to be properly paid for its expenses.

Turriano is attributed as the creator of the "Clockwork Prayer", an automaton representing a monk manufactured in the 1560s based on a commission from Philip II of Spain.  Following the recovery of his son, and in the belief that Didacus of Alcalá had in some way intervened on his behalf, King Philip II of Spain would have commissioned Juanelo Turriano, mechanic to his father, to build a clockwork model of Didacus. The model would perform a number of set actions, including the beating of the breast which accompanies the  prayer. An automaton of similar age, functions, and appearance is in the collections of the National Museum of American History, Smithsonian Institution.

Another automaton associated with Turriano is a figure of a lady playing a lute housed in the Kunsthistorisches Museum, Vienna.

He died at Toledo in 1585.

Bibliography
 Zanetti, Cristiano. Janello Torriani and the Spanish Empire: A Vitruvian Artisan at the Dawn of the Scientific Revolution. Brill, 2017.

References

This article is mostly translated from the longer Spanish language article.

External links
 El artificio de Juanelo The water fetching automaton.
Juanelo Turriano Foundation 
 Reconstrucción del artificio de Juanelo (PDF format)
 The new model of the hydraulic machine known as El Artificio de Juanelo in three-dimensional computer simulation

1500s births
1585 deaths
Scientists from Cremona
Italian clockmakers
Spanish clockmakers
16th-century Italian engineers
16th-century Italian inventors
Italian emigrants to Spain
16th-century robots